Longwood is a residential locality of North Western Shimla. It is located on the Elysium Hill, one of the seven hills on which Shimla is located. It is part of a heavily forested area. The locality houses the Census office and an electrical substation.

Neighbourhoods in Shimla

British-era buildings in Himachal Pradesh